C.C.P. Contact Probes Co., Ltd. is a Taiwanese manufacturer of testing probes and probe-like connectors. The company was founded by Chung-Kai Huang (黃介崇) on January 22, 1986 and is headquartered in New Taipei, Taiwan. C.C.P Contact Probes., Ltd. operates internationally with global sales offices in China, Hong Kong, USA and Germany and has approximately 1000 employees. The 4 main products are testing solutions, Pogo Pin Connectors, EV Crown Spring Connectors and Industrial Connectors. The company is a supplier for Pogo Pin connectors of major brands around the world such as Apple, Huawei, and Microsoft. Known products such as the Macbook Series from Apple Inc. or the Surface Pro 4  from Microsoft are using magnet connectors from C.C.P. Contact Probes.

C.C.P. Contact Probes Co., Ltd. is listed at the Taiwanese Stock Exchange (Bloomberg Ticker: 6217:TT). In 2017, it had approximately NTD1,892.3 million (~USD60 million) revenue and a Net Income of NTD159.3 million (~USD5.15 million).

History 

 2020 Korea Branch Established
 2019 Singapore and Japanese Branch Established
 2018 European and Indian Branch Established
 2015 Launch of the USA Office in San Jose and roll out of new Contact Pin Series
 2012 Set up 2nd generation production line with 100K-class clean room and developed the Crown Spring Connector series
 2010 Obtained ISO 9001:2008
 2009 Developed Magnetic Connector with Lenovo and set up the Plating Lab
 2008 Obtained ISO QC 080000 certificate and set up of C.C.P. International  Co., Ltd. office in Hong Kong
 2006 Set up of IC Socket factory in Taipei and the Beijing Branch Office
 2003 Listed in Taiwan Stock Market (TW.6217)
 2002 Obtained BSI ISO 9001:2000 certificate
 2000 Dong Guan C.C.P. Contact Probes Co., Ltd. was founded
 1986 CCP Contact Probes Enterprise Co., Ltd established

Finance 

C.C.P. Contact Probes Co., Ltd. is listed at the Taiwanese Stock Exchange (ISIN TW0006217003). In 2016, it had approximately NTD1,892.3 million(~USD60 million) revenue and a Net Income of NTD159.3 million (~USD5.15  million). The company invests approximately 7% of its operating revenue in R&D activities.

Ownership

Sales

See also
 List of companies of Taiwan

References 

1986 establishments in Taiwan
Technology companies established in 1986
Manufacturing companies based in New Taipei